Thierry Perrier (born 16 April 1950, in Boulogne) is a French racing driver. He raced mainly in sportscars and GT.

24 Hours of Le Mans results

References

1950 births
Living people
French racing drivers
24 Hours of Le Mans drivers